Central Avenue station is a light rail station located off Central Avenue near Eliot Street in Milton, Massachusetts. It serves the Ashmont–Mattapan High Speed Line, a branch of the MBTA Red Line. Central Avenue consists of two side platforms which serve the Ashmont–Mattapan High Speed Line's two tracks. The station opened in 1929 along with the rest of the line. It closed on June 24, 2006, for a yearlong renovation of the line, and reopened on December 22, 2007. The station is accessible via wooden ramps on both platforms.

References

External links

MBTA – Central Avenue
 Station from Central Avenue from Google Maps Street View

Red Line (MBTA) stations
Railway stations in Norfolk County, Massachusetts
Railway stations in Boston
Railway stations in the United States opened in 1929
Milton, Massachusetts